The Box Office Entertainment Award for Box Office King is an award presented annually by the Memorial Scholarship Foundation, led by Corazon Samaniego. It was first awarded at the 1st Box Office Entertainment Awards ceremony, held in 1971 and it is given in honor of an actor whose films set the highest box office record in the film industry.

Winners

Awards

References

Film awards for lead actor
Box Office Entertainment Awards